is a Japanese super robot anime television series. The animation from GoLion was edited and trimmed to create the version of the American Voltron: Defender of the Universe series, with new names and dialogue. In 2008, GoLion was released on Region 1 DVD in three volumes. To coincide with the anime's original run, a manga adaptation by Yoshiki Tsuchiyama was serialized in TV Land (テレビランド, Terebi Rando).

Story
GoLions story is set in 1999, when the planet Altea is subdued and enslaved by the Galra Empire. Meanwhile, five space pilots (Akira Kogane, Takashi Shirogane, Isamu Kurogane, Tsuyoshi Seidou and Hiroshi Suzuichi) return to Earth from their latest space exploration, only to find the planet annihilated by an apocalyptic, thermonuclear war, World War III. Suddenly, the explorers are ambushed, captured and enslaved by the visiting Galra Empire, and then, they are forced to fight for their lives in Emperor Daibazaal's arena.

The young pilots escape and eventually land on the planet Altea, where they discover the secret of the mighty sentient robot GoLion, the only weapon powerful enough to defeat Emperor Daibazaal's forces. Thousands of years ago, GoLion was an arrogant robot who, after defeating several Beastmen, tried to challenge the goddess of the universe into battle, but failed. For GoLion's hubris, the goddess taught him humility by separating him into five pieces in the form of five lion robots that sailed through space and crash-landed on Altea, to lay in wait for those who would one day reawaken him to fight evil once again. The Princess of Altea, Fala, recruits the five of them so they can become the new pilots of GoLion and help her start fighting back against the Empire.

Characters

The GoLion team
 / 
Nickname:  An even-tempered young man and a natural leader, Akira leads the GoLion team in the Black Lion and wears a red uniform. A strategic thinker, he can quickly assess whatever difficult situation the GoLion team is in, and take decisive and often correct action. He is known to be quite rough on his team at times in accomplishing their goals, but he is ultimately a fair leader who cares deeply for his comrades. Kogane counts on all of them to be up to the challenge of opposing Galra, as Golion's allies are likewise counting on them. "Kogane" is based on the Japanese word for gold.

 /  (Episode 1-6)
Nickname:  Takashi was the original second-in-command. He piloted the Blue Lion and wore a black uniform. He is approximately the same age as Akira. In episode 6, he was wounded during an attack by Honerva and later died from his injuries. He was given a hero's burial. Princess Fala replaced him as the Blue Lion's pilot. He had a younger brother named Ryou, who, along with Princess Amue, joined the heroes in the fight against the Galra Empire. Ryou also perished in battle. "Shirogane" is based on the Japanese word for silver.

 / 
Nickname:  Second-in-command of GoLion, Isamu pilots the Red Lion and wears a blue uniform. He is tall, wiry, and wily, and is approximately 21-23 years of age. Isamu is always joking and teasing others whenever he gets the chance. He is the only one in the group who contests any of Akira's commands. He is also a ladies' man and a great pilot, though a bit too daring at times. "Kurogane" is based on the Japanese word for iron or steel.

 / 
Nickname:  Tsuyoshi is the quick-tempered strongman of the group. He pilots the Yellow Lion and wears an orange uniform. He is roughly 22-24 years old. He may look tough and mean, but he has a soft heart, especially when it comes to children. He is never late for a meal. Though his friends tease him about his appetite, Tsuyoshi is very muscular. "Seidō" is based on the Japanese word for bronze.

 / 
Nickname:  Hiroshi is the youngest and smallest of the group. He pilots the Green Lion and wears a green uniform. He is approximately 12 years old. Hiroshi graduated from the academy at a young age, and his specialty is science. Like the others, he is well-trained in martial arts, and uses his size and agility to his advantage, owing to his ninja lineage. Hiroshi is not afraid to speak his mind, especially to the villains. "Suzuishi" is based on the Japanese word for tin.

 / 
Fala, is the ruler of the Kingdom of Altea, and is 16 years old.  She was raised by Raible after her parents, older brothers an older sister were executed by Daibazaal when she was a year old, and has sworn revenge against him for ravaging her planet. After the death of Shirogane, Fala takes it upon herself to pilot the Blue Lion, much to the surprise of everyone. As Blue Lion's pilot, she wears a pink uniform, the spirit of her father will sometimes appear, and provide guidance. At 16 years of age, she is strong-willed and a bit naïve, resisting attempts by Raible and Hys to make her behave in a more royal fashion. Fala is also relatively inexperienced as a pilot, which occasionally puts both herself and GoLion in danger. She is also lustfully pursued by Imperial Prince Sincline (whom she detests), due to her resemblance to his dead mother, Emperor Daibazaal's concubine.  Her sole living relative is her aunt, Queen Elena. She is friends with a family of mice (Platt and Chuchule) who have kept her company since she was a little girl.

Other allies
 / 
Raible is Fala's royal adviser and is in charge of the Castle Control. He spirited away the baby Fala from the clutches of Daibazaal 15 years earlier, and raised her like his own daughter. He also advises the GoLion team, and can be very over-protective of Fala and opinionated at times.

 / 
Hys is Fala's over-protective caregiver, who always wants to make all of Fala's decisions for her. Like Raible, Hys fusses over the Princess, and is bent on keeping her away from all harm. She often comes into conflict with the four men on the Golion team, out of concern they are causing a negative influence on Fala. Suzuishi sometimes derogatorily calls her "Hys-teria." She dies near the finale when protecting Raible from a laser blast.

 / 
King Raimon is Fala's deceased father and previous ruler of Planet Altea. Fifteen years earlier, Raimon went forth to battle against Emperor Daibazaal and his Galra forces. He was caught and executed  with his wife and elder children, leaving Fala as his only surviving descendant. His body and the keys to the Lions were placed in a royal tomb located right underneath the castle. He returns to the world of the living every so often as a ghost to give advice to Fala to help her in her struggle against the Galra Empire.

 (voice actors unknown)
A family of five mice that live in Gradam Castle. They were Princess Fala's only friends while she was growing up, and she is the only one who can understand their language. Their nemesis is Jaga, the cat of the witch Honerva.

 / 
Takashi's younger brother, a former prisoner on Planet Galra who escapes and later rescues Princess Amue. He bears a strong resemblance to his older brother, though he has longer sideburns. Ryou learns from Amue that Takashi is dead, and vows to avenge his death. In the final episode he kills Sincline at the cost of his own life.

 (voice actor unknown)
Princess Amue is Fala's cousin. She lives on Planet Heracles, where she co-rules with her younger brother, Prince Alor. Her father, King Heracles, once had an alliance with Emperor Daibazaal. Her older brother, Prince Samson, was transformed into a Beast Fighter, which caused his death at the hands of Galra for refusing to fight further. She is a dead-ringer for Princess Fala in terms of physical appearance. Though once a slave of Sincline, Takashi's brother Ryou came to her rescue when she was about to be executed, together they fight for her people against the Galra Empire. Amue appears to have romantic feelings for Ryou.

 / 
Princess Amue's younger brother. He used to admire Sincline's skill as a fighter, but after witnessing the deaths of both his father and older brother by Galra forces, followed by the abduction of his sister by Sincline, the young prince is left devastated. With the  encouragement of the Golion team, he joins forces with them and Altea in their fight with Galra, and to rescue Amue from Sincline's clutches.

The Goddess of the Universe 
 She is one that split the GoLion into five robotic lions to teach the GoLion humility. So many years later, after GoLion has proven his worth and learning humility, the Goddess of the Universe restores GoLion's lost power and makes him stronger than ever.

The Galra Empire
The  are a race of merciless individuals who even oppress their own people. They capture other planets and enslave their population, forcing them to serve its evil ruler, Emperor Daibazaal. Daibazaal's son, Prince Sincline, conquered other worlds and beheaded their leaders as trophies. The Galra Empire invades planets with the aid of Galran Beast Fighters.

 /  (Episode 1-51)
The Emperor of Galra and a sadistic, tyrannical, supreme ruler who is the illegitimate child of the previous emperor and Honerva. He uses his subjects and even his own son, Sincline, as his scapegoats whenever he fails. He hates all that is good and wants to conquer the universe. He has enslaved countless civilizations, claiming them for the glory of himself. He loses his temper easily, and even killed one of his allies the ruler of Jarre when his birthday celebration was ruined by GoLion. Later, he sentences Sincline to imprisonment as part of the Galran law against repeated failures. Daibazal's slaves are usually humans, but at one point he raped a blonde Altean woman to produce his son, Sincline. When he failed in his mission after imprisoning his own son for failure, Sincline turned the tables and forced him to pilot Mecha Beast Fighter Galra made in his own image. Although he was able to pin down GoLion and almost destroy him with a battle axe, a miracle occurred. GoLion's sword emitted a sudden energy boost, and his repaired Laser Sword managed to backfire at the Beastman, weakening him severely. GoLion destroyed the robot with Daibazaal inside, killing him.

 /  (Episode 14-52)
Crown prince of Galra and a half-Altean. A dangerous, cunning, and occasionally unstable adversary, Sincline's brutality rivals even his father's, his only weakness is the fact that he fell in love with Princess Fala, who somewhat resembles his mother whom his father, Emperor Daibazaal, killed after begging a favor to pardon the other prisoners but was refused. He plots to overthrow his own father and marry Princess Fala. He is a sly, scheming villain with a sense of honor, preferring to fight fair over his father's dirty tactics, and is Akira's frequent rival. Like his father, Sincline loses his temper easily and kills his own men with very little provocation. He even killed his own slave woman once when she accidentally spilled some liquid Sincline was drinking on his leg. Towards the end, Sincline and his followers depose Daibazaal, and Sincline declares himself emperor. Unfortunately for him, the tide has since turned against Galra, and Golion and his allies have brought the fight to the planet Galra itself. Sincline finds himself completely surrounded in his castle by the Golion force. Realizing the game is up, Sincline's remaining followers plead with him to surrender for the sake of Galra, to which he responds by summarily executing them. The Golion team plus Ryou enter the castle to capture Sincline, but he managed to escape to the top of the castle, taking Ryou with him as a hostage. On the top spire of Castle Galra, Sincline prepares to melt down GoLion with a beam cannon, while holding Ryou at sword-point. The space mice attack Sincline with their robot, distracting him long enough for Ryou to stab him in the chest with a dagger, and they both fall off the spire to their deaths.

 /  (Episode 1-51)
A scientist/witch who uses certain magic spells, like hypnotism, and disguises. She also creates the legendary Beast Fighters, which are the apex of Galran technology and sends them against GoLion.  She is hinted to be secretly the previous emperor's mistress and despises Sincline's Altean blood. When Emperor Daibazaal piloted the last Beast Fighter, she wanted to grant the Emperor victory. She is killed by Prince Sincline's sword at the end of the series after the destruction of Galra Castle when she betrays him by helping GoLion instead and revealing the truth that Daibazaal was her illegitimate son by the previous emperor (thus making her Sincline's grandmother though he felt no attachment to her), and that Sincline's mother was an Altean woman.

 (Episode 1-51)
Honerva's pet Space Cat, with whom Honerva is able to communicate (similar to how Fala can communicate with the Space Mice). He is the arch-enemy of the Space Mice. Sincline killed him by slashing him before killing Honerva.

 /  (Episode 1-14)
Military commander of Planet Galra. He heads the invasion force as the Emperor's best general. However, his constant failures against GoLion for so long caused him to be sentenced to death by the Emperor. Banished, Prince Sincline gave him a chance to become a gigantic Beast Fighter and fight GoLion to redeem himself. When this happened, he was killed by GoLion in their final battle, allowing Sincline to step in as commander of the Galran military against Planet Altea.

 /  (Episode 17-52)
A soldier assigned to Prince Sincline. Killed by Sincline in the last episode.

Blackman Soldiers
Galran foot soldiers that perform sadistic operations like starving, whipping, and killing slaves.

Reggar (Episode 37)
He was trying to get the position of Supreme Commander of the Galra Air Force. However, he was killed in battle against GoLion while piloting a seemingly undefeatable Beast Fighter, when he presumably committed suicide.

Golion

Golion was separated into five separate lion robots by a space goddess who wished to teach Golion humility until he could be reassembled. Golion later gains a soul after being reawakened by the five pilots who use Golion to protect the universe from Emperor Daibazaal's forces. Individually, the lions weigh 154.4 tons.

Forms the torso and head of GoLion. Powered by lightning. Piloted by Akira.

Forms the right arm of GoLion. Powered by fire. Piloted by Isamu.

Forms the left arm of GoLion. Powered by wind. Piloted by Hiroshi.

Forms the right leg of GoLion. Powered by water. Piloted by Takashi, and later Fala after Takashi's death.

Forms the left leg of GoLion. Powered by earth. Piloted by Tsuyoshi.

Each Lion has a Lion Blade (a boomerang held in the lion's mouth), dorsal missiles, and shoulder-mounted lasers. The name is a pun: Jūō written with the kanji 獣王 means Beast King. In Media Blasters' release of GoLion, it is translated as "King's Sword Jyuoken" (when summoning the weapon, otherwise it is simply "Jyuoken").

Beastmen

Galran Deathblack Beastmen
Galran  were previously Beast Fighters, serving as the apex of Galran technology and dark magic, and are sent by Honerva against Golion. Anyone captured and enslaved by the Galran Empire are immediately herded into the arena on Planet Galra where they are forced to fight to the death against the larger, powerful, and deadlier Beastmen who can easily kill them before an enthusiastic crowd. Then the slaves are butchered and made into slave stew, a favorite gruesome dish for the Beastmen to eat and also fed to surviving slaves as a form of forced cannibalism to turn them to be as savage as the Beastmen. Anyone who survives fighting the Deathblack Beastmen are subjected to Honerva's dark magic that changes them into Beastmen to fight Golion.

Galran Mechablack Beastmen
Galran  are the successors of the Deathblack Beastmen and first appear in episode 31; most of their names are taken after letters of the Greek Alphabet. Unlike deathblacks, mechablacks are constructed at planet Galra's occult science plant instead of the coliseum and use beastmen as their brain component.

Notably, Emperor Daibazaal unwillingly becomes part of a mechablack beastman in the series' final episodes.

Changes for Voltron

GoLion footage was heavily edited and re-assembled by World Events Productions in the U.S. to create Voltron. Changes made to the series included rewritten dialogue, omitted character deaths, toned-down violence, and altered plot developments. In addition, Toei Animation Ltd. created and animated a brand new plot arc specifically for the U.S. Voltron series. Toei sold all of its rights to GoLion to World Events Productions, as GoLion had achieved only average ratings in Japan, in comparison to the popularity of Voltron in the U.S., and the series has yet to receive a DVD release in Japan.

Episodes

Releases
Media Blasters released GoLion on DVD in the U.S. in 3 volumes:
 Collection 1 was released on May 27, 2008.
 Collection 2 was released on August 12, 2008.
 Collection 3 was released on November 25, 2008.

GoLion episodes have at times been made available for viewing on World Events Productions' YouTube channel.

Staff
Original Creator: "Saburo Hatte" (pseudonym for Toei staff)
General Director: Katsuhiko Taguchi
Series Composition: Susumu Takaku
Episode Direction: Kazuyuki Okaseko, Hiroshi Sasagawa, Kazuya Miyazaki, Johei Matsuura, Tatsuya Kasahara
Character Designs: Kazuo Nakamura
Mechanical Designs: Katsushi Murakami, Takayuki Masuo, Yoshiro Harada, Submarine
Animation Direction: Kazuo Nakamura, Moriyasu Taniguchi, Akira Shinoda, Akira Saijo, Hiroshi Iino, Hiromitsu Ohta
Music: Masahisa Takeichi
Opening Theme: “Tatakae! GoLion” (Fight, GoLion!)
Ending Theme: “Gonin de Hitotsu” (One Of Every Five People) performed by Ichiro Mizuki & Koorogi '73 (Nippon Columbia)

References

External links

Hyaku Ju Oh Goraion SGB's GoLion site, shows difference between Voltron and the original GoLion
GoLion and Voltron at Encirobopedia

Voltron
1981 anime television series debuts
1981 Japanese television series debuts
1982 Japanese television series endings
Anime Works
Post-apocalyptic anime and manga
Super robot anime and manga
Television series set in 1999
Television series set in the future
Toei Animation television
TV Tokyo original programming